Pennsylvania's 7th congressional district includes all of Carbon, Lehigh, and Northampton Counties; and parts of Monroe County. The district is represented by Democrat Susan Wild.

From 2013 through 2018, the district incorporated parts of the Philadelphia suburbs, including most of Delaware County, along with portions of Chester, Montgomery, Berks, and Lancaster Counties. The district exhibited extreme non-congruity during that time as a result of gerrymandering. On January 22, 2018, the Supreme Court of Pennsylvania ruled that the map violated the state constitution, and in February, it issued its own district boundaries for use in the 2018 elections and representation thereafter. Most of the population in the old 7th district became part of a new 5th district, encompassing all of Delaware County and parts of South Philadelphia; while most of the old 15th district became the new 7th district. In the 2020 redistricting cycle, Carbon County was added into the district, in exchange for the area around East Stroudsburg in Monroe County.

Pat Meehan, who had represented the old 7th district since 2011, resigned on April 27, 2018, amid a sexual harassment case. Mary Gay Scanlon won the special election on November 6, 2018, to replace him for the remainder of his term, and she served for slightly less than two months as the last representative for the old 7th district before being transferred to the newly redrawn 5th district. Susan Wild won the general election in the newly redrawn 7th district, and she took office January 3, 2019.

Elections
The following table includes election results for previous incarnations of the 7th congressional district; see #Historical district boundaries.

Geography
The 2003–2012 version of the district was located in southeastern Pennsylvania. It contained the western and northwestern suburbs of Philadelphia. It consisted of the majority of Delaware County (except for the City of Chester and some of the eastern boroughs), a portion of Chester County east of West Chester in the affluent Philadelphia Main Line area, and a portion of southern Montgomery County centered on Upper Merion Township.

The 2013–2018 version of the district contained most of Delaware County outside of the City of Chester and the heavily African American townships and boroughs in the eastern portion of the county. It also contained parts of central Montgomery County, southern portions of Berks County, southern and central portions of Chester County, and a small portion of eastern Lancaster County.  The District as it stood in October 2016 was named on NPR's On the Media as an egregious example of gerrymandering. The shape of the district was described as "Goofy kicking Donald Duck. The only point that is essentially contiguous there is Goofy's foot in Donald Duck's rear end. ... However these district lines are the building blocks of democracy, and when they get as perverted and twisted as this, it leads to deeply undemocratic outcomes." The Washington Post listed it as one of the ten most gerrymandered districts in the country.

On February 19, 2018, the Supreme Court of Pennsylvania released a new congressional map after lawmakers had failed to agree on a map that would reduce gerrymandering. The map substantially redrew the District, relocating it to the Lehigh Valley. The newly redrawn district includes all of Lehigh County and Northampton County as well as parts of Monroe County.

Demographics

The district encompasses the Lehigh Valley and exurban Philadelphia. 2010 United States census describes the district as nearly 70% caucasian. The district encompasses Lehigh University. The 2020 Cook PVI pegs it as EVEN changing from D+1 from the 2016 presidential cycle.

List of members representing the district

1791–1793: One seat
District created in 1791.

1795–1823: One seat

District restored in 1795.

1823–1833: Two seats

1833–Present: One seat

Historical district boundaries

See also

List of United States congressional districts
Pennsylvania's congressional districts

Notes

References

External links
District map
Congressional redistricting in Pennsylvania
Congressional Biographical Directory of the United States 1774–present

07
1791 establishments in Pennsylvania
Constituencies established in 1791
Constituencies disestablished in 1793
1793 disestablishments in Pennsylvania
Constituencies established in 1795
1795 establishments in Pennsylvania